Peter Storr Garlake (11 January 1934 - 2 December 2011) was a Zimbabwean archaeologist and art historian, who made influential contributions to the study of Great Zimbabwe and Ife, Nigeria.

Life
Garlake began his career in African art and archaeology as a Nuffield Research Student, British Institute in Eastern Africa from 1962 to 1964, carrying out excavations at Manekweni in Mozambique.

From 1964 to 1970, Garlake served as the Rhodesian Inspector of Monuments and was on faculty at the University of Rhodesia. During this time his research focused on the early history of Great Zimbabwe. He argued that Great Zimbabwe was constructed by the ancestors of the current inhabitants of the area, the Shona people, as opposed to being constructed by a non-African or outsider civilization. This research was opposed by the whites-only Rhodesian government, including the prime minister, Ian Smith, and Garlake was forced to leave the country in 1970.

Garlake relocated to Ife, Nigeria, and between 1971 and 1973 was a senior research fellow at the University of Ife, where he researched the early art and archaeology of Ile-Ife. From 1976 to 1981, Garlake held an appointment as lecturer in the Department of Anthropology at University College London. Following Zimbabwean Independence, Garlake returned to Zimbabwe and spent the next ten years conducting his research on early Zimbabwean rock art.

Garlake had to leave Rhodesia to move to Barnes with his 3 Children and wife. He then returned to the new Zimbabwean Independence once allowed under the new Government. After years of work, he finally settled in Barnes London, where he had 3 Grandchildren, 2 Granddaughters and 1 Grandson, all under the names of Garlake.

Works
The Early Islamic Architecture of the East African Coast (1966)
Great Zimbabwe (1973)
The Kingdoms of Africa (1978)
The Hunter's Vision (1995)
Early Art and Architecture of Africa (2002)

References

Zimbabwean people of British descent
White Rhodesian people
Zimbabwean exiles
University of Zimbabwe
1934 births
2011 deaths
Zimbabwean archaeologists
Zimbabwean expatriates in Nigeria
Academic staff of Obafemi Awolowo University
Zimbabwean expatriates in Mozambique
Rhodesian archaeologists
Rhodesian people of British descent
Academic staff of the University of Zimbabwe